"Ögon som glittrar" is a song by Swedish pop band Freestyle, released in 1982 as the lead single from their second studio album, Modiga agenter (1982).

Track listing and formats 

 Swedish 7-inch single

A. "Ögon som glittrar" – 3:03
B. "Om och om igen" – 3:54

 Swedish 12-inch single

A. "Ögon som glittrar" (Re-mix) – 4:38
B. "Om och om igen" – 3:54

Charts

References

External links 

 

1982 songs
1982 singles
Freestyle (Swedish band) songs
Number-one singles in Finland
Songs written by Christer Sandelin
Songs written by Gigi Hamilton
Swedish-language songs